Andrés Gómez-Lobo Echenique (born 17 March 1965) is a Chilean economist and scholar who served as Minister of Transport and Telecommunications during the second government of Michelle Bachelet.

References

External links
 Profile at Economy and Business Faculty

1965 births
Living people
Chilean people
People from Santiago
Pontifical Catholic University of Chile alumni
Alumni of University College London
Party for Democracy (Chile) politicians
21st-century Chilean politicians